The following list creates a summary of the two major producers of different minerals (and coal, which is generally not considered a mineral).

Fuels

Fossil fuels

Nuclear fuel

Gemstones

Metals

See also
Lists of mines

References